Zanzye Herterzena A. Hill (January 12, 1906 – April 4, 1935) was Nebraska’s first African American female lawyer.

Early life and education 
Hill was born in Yazoo City, Mississippi and raised in Lincoln, Nebraska, the daughter of Pinck M. E. Hill and Eliza Johnson Hill. Her older sister Brevy Hill Miller became a newspaper columnist; her younger sister XaCadene Hill Fox became a physician.

She graduated from Lincoln High School in 1924. She completed a bachelor's degree at the University of Nebraska–Lincoln (UNL) in 1927. In 1929, Hill—whose poetry appeared in campus publications—became UNL's first African American female law graduate. She was a member of the Alpha Kappa Alpha sorority chapter at UNL, and the only Black member of the university vesper choir. She was also active with the Interracial Commission of the University YWCA.

Career 
Shortly after law school, Hill became the first African American woman admitted to practice law in Nebraska. She taught briefly at Tuskegee Institute, and worked as chief counsel for an Arkansas insurance company.

Personal life and legacy 
Hill died in 1935, in Mississippi, at the age of 29. She had been in poor health for some time, and was hospitalized for a surgery shortly before her death. Hill's achievements were recalled when Elizabeth Davis Pittman became the second Black woman was admitted to the Nebraska bar, in 1948. In 1982, Hill was one of the five historical Nebraskans honored during the state's first Women's History Week.

See also 

 List of first women lawyers and judges in Nebraska

References

External links 

 Cecily Barker McDaniel (2007), “Fearing I Shall Not Do My Duty to My Race If I Remain Silent”: Law and Its Call to African American Women, 1872-1932  (PhD dissertation, Ohio State University).

Nebraska lawyers
University of Nebraska–Lincoln alumni
1906 births
1935 deaths
20th-century American lawyers
20th-century American women lawyers
People from Yazoo City, Mississippi
African-American lawyers